The 1962 Big Ten Conference football season was the 67th season of college football played by the member schools of the Big Ten Conference and was a part of the 1962 NCAA University Division football season.

The 1962 Wisconsin Badgers football team, under head coach Milt Bruhn, compiled an 8–2 record, won the Big Ten championship, led the conference in scoring offense (32.2 points per game), and was ranked No. 2 in the final AP Poll. After losing only one game in the regular season, the Badgers lost to USC in the 1963 Rose Bowl.  Quarterback Ron Vander Kelen led the Big Ten with 1,582 passing yards and 1,839 total yards and won the Chicago Tribune Silver Football as the conference's most valuable player. End Pat Richter led the conference with 694 receiving yards and was a consensus first-team All-American.

The 1962 Minnesota Golden Gophers football team, under head coach Murray Warmath, compiled a 6–2–1 record, led the conference in scoring defense (6.8 points allowed per game), finished in second place in the Big Ten, and was ranked No. 10 in the final AP Poll. Tackle Bobby Bell was a consensus first-team All-American, won the Outland Trophy as college football's best interior lineman, and finished third in the voting for the 1962 Heisman Trophy.

The 1962 Northwestern Wildcats football team, under head coach Ara Parseghian, compiled a 7–2 record and finished in third place in the conference. The Wildcats were ranked No. 1 in the AP Poll before losing consecutive games late in the season. They remained ranked No. 16 in the final Coaches' Poll. Quarterback Tom Myers totaled 1,537 passing yards, and center Jack Cvercko was a consensus first-team All-American.

The conference's other statistical leaders included Michigan State fullback George Saimes with 642 rushing yards and Wisconsin's Lou Holland with 72 points scored.

Season overview

Results and team statistics

Key
AP final = Team's rank in the final AP Poll of the 1962 season
AP high = Team's highest rank in the AP Poll throughout the 1962 season
PPG = Average of points scored per game
PAG = Average of points allowed per game
MVP = Most valuable player as voted by players on each team as part of the voting process to determine the winner of the Chicago Tribune Silver Football trophy; trophy winner in bold

Preseason
There were no changes in the conference's head football coaches between the 1961 and 1962 seasons.

Regular season

Bowl games

On January 1, 1963, USC (ranked No. 1) defeated Wisconsin (ranked No. 2), 42–37, at the Rose Bowl in Pasadena, California. This was the first No. 1 versus No. 2 match-up to occur in a bowl game. Ron Vander Kelen, the Wisconsin quarterback and Pete Beathard, the USC quarterback, were both named the Rose Bowl Player of the Game. Down 42–14 in the fourth quarter, Vander Kelen put together a number of drives to score 23 unanswered points and put the Badgers in position to win the game.

Post-season developments
There were no changes in the conference's head football coaches between the 1962 and 1963 seasons.

Statistical leaders

The Big Ten's individual statistical leaders for the 1962 season include the following:

Passing yards

Rushing yards

Receiving yards

Total yards

Scoring

Awards and honors

All-Big Ten honors

The following players were picked by the Associated Press (AP) and/or the United Press International (UPI) as first-team players on the 1962 All-Big Ten Conference football team.

All-American honors

At the end of the 1962 season, Big Ten players secured four of the 11 consensus first-team picks for the 1962 College Football All-America Team. The Big Ten's consensus All-Americans were:

Other Big Ten players who were named first-team All-Americans by at least one selector were:

Other awards

Bobby Bell of Minnesota won the Outland Trophy as the best interior lineman in college football. He also finished third in the voting of the Heisman Trophy.

1963 NFL Draft
The following Big Ten players were among the first 100 picks in the 1963 NFL Draft:

References